Wetland conservation is aimed at protecting and preserving areas where water exists at or near the Earth's surface, such as swamps, marshes and bogs. Wetlands cover at least six per cent of the Earth and have become a focal issue for conservation due to the ecosystem services they provide. More than three billion people, around half the world’s population, obtain their basic water needs from inland freshwater wetlands. The same number of people rely on rice as their staple food, a crop grown largely in natural and artificial wetlands. In some parts of the world, such as the Kilombero wetland in Tanzania, almost the entire local population relies on wetland cultivation for their livelihoods.

Fisheries are also an extremely important source of protein and income in many wetlands. According to the United Nations Food and Agriculture Organization, the total catch from inland waters (rivers and wetlands) was 8.7 million metric tonnes in 2002. In addition to food, wetlands supply fibre, fuel and medicinal plants. They also provide valuable ecosystems for birds and other aquatic creatures, help reduce the damaging impact of floods, control pollution and regulate the climate. From economic importance, to aesthetics, the reasons for conserving wetlands have become numerous over the past few decades.

Wetland definition
Various definitions of wetlands exist. The Convention on Wetlands of International Importance, also known as the Ramsar Convention, defines wetlands as including: lakes and rivers, swamps and marshes, wet grasslands and peatlands, oases, estuaries, deltas and tidal flats, near-shore marine areas, mangroves and coral reefs, and human-made sites such as fish ponds, rice paddies, reservoirs, and salt pans. Meanwhile, the United States Environmental Protection Agency (EPA) or Wetlands Reserve Program, describes wetlands as "those areas that are inundated or saturated by surface or groundwater at a frequency and duration sufficient to support, and that under normal circumstances do support, a prevalence of vegetation typically adapted for life in saturated soil conditions. Wetlands generally include swamps, marshes, bogs and similar areas." Wetlands vary widely in their salinity levels, climatic zones, supported flora, surrounding geography, whether they are coastal or inland and so on.

Wetland functions
The main functions performed by wetlands are: water filtration, water storage, biological productivity, and provide habitat for wildlife.  Additional functions and uses of wetlands are described in wetland.

Filtration

Wetlands aid in water filtration by removing excess nutrients, slowing the water allowing particulates to settle out of the water which can then be absorbed into plant roots. Studies have shown that up to 92% of phosphorus and 95% of nitrogen can be removed from passing water through a wetland. Wetlands also let pollutants settle and stick to soil particles, up to 70% of sediments in runoff. Some wetland plants have even been found with accumulations of heavy metals more than 100,000 times that of the surrounding waters' concentration. Without these functions, the waterways would continually increase their nutrient and pollutant load, leading to an isolated deposit of high concentrations further down the line. An example of such a situation is the Mississippi River’s dead zone, an area where nutrient excess has led to large amounts of surface algae, which use up the oxygen and create hypoxic conditions (very low levels of oxygen).

Wetlands can even filter out and absorb harmful bacteria from the water. Their complex food chain hosts various microbes and bacteria, which invertebrates feed on. These invertebrates can filter up to 90% of bacteria out of the water this way.

Storage
Wetlands can store approximately 1-1.5 million gallons of floodwater per acre. When you combined with the approximate total acres of wetlands in the United States (107.7 million acres), means that US wetlands can likely store over a trillion gallons of floodwater. By storing and slowing water, wetlands allow groundwater to be recharged. "A 550,000 acre swamp in Florida has been valued at $25 million per year for its role in storing water and recharging the aquifer." And combining the ability of wetlands to store and slow down water with their ability to filter out sediments, wetlands serve as strong erosion buffers.

Biological productivity
Through wetlands ability to absorb nutrients, they are able to be highly biologically productive (able to produce biomass quickly). Freshwater wetlands are even comparable to tropical rainforests in plant productivity. Their ability to efficiently create biomass may become important to the development of alternative energy sources.

While wetlands only cover around 5% of the Conterminous United States’s land surface, they support 31% of the plant species. They also support, through feeding and nesting, up to ½ of the native North American bird species. Bird populations, while playing a major role in food webs, are also the focus of several, well-funded recreation sports. (Waterfowl hunting and bird watching to name a pair)

Wildlife habitat
Wildlife Habitat is important not only for the conservation of species but also for a number of recreational opportunities. As a conservation purpose, wildlife habitat is managed for maintaining and using the resources in sustainable manner. Ninety-five percent of all commercially harvested fish and shellfish in the United States are wetland dependent. Muscatatuck National Wildlife Refuge is an example of recreational destination for hunting, fishing, wildlife observation and photography that has a good wildlife management. Some parts of the area are wetlands managed for providing habitat of migratory birds, such as waterfowl and songbirds. The 14 million United States hunters generate in excess of $50 billion annually in economic activity. This does not include the 60 million people that watch migratory birds as a hobby. The Florida Keys wetland area generates more than $800 million in annual tourism income alone. 

Wetlands can support surprisingly large diversity of birds even when managed for human use, like the community-managed wetlands of the Gangetic floodplains of northern India that have among the highest human densities in the world but also have the highest known bird diversity in agricultural wetlands anywhere. Similarly, contrary to common assumptions that high human densities in tropical would deter bird use of urban ponds (wetlands < 5 ha), ponds of Delhi, the capital city of India, have over 117 bird species, that are ~37% of all birds ever seen in the city. These relatively recent studies from the global south are helping understand that traditional human use of wetlands for myriad purposes, when illegal hunting is controlled to minimal levels via cultural beliefs, can sustain biodiversity and serve as excellent wildlife habitats.

Conservation by country
Conservation efforts vary in intensity and method by country. The following list is not comprehensive.

New Zealand

Over 90% of the wetlands in New Zealand have been drained since European settlement, predominantly to create farmland. Wetlands now have a degree of protection under the Resource Management Act 1991.

Republic of Macedonia
The fragments of wetland habitats that are still in existence in the Republic of Macedonia are present as marsh or swamp communities. These patches are present at Studenchishte (small fragment near Ohrid Lake), Pelagonia (village Chepigovo), Negortsi Spa, Bansko, Belchishte wetland and Monospitovo marsh. The large areas of swamps that used to be present in most of the valleys in contemporary Republic of Macedonia have undergone a great transformation over the last 50–60 years. The main cause for their reduction is land reclamation, drainage, and conversion into arable land for agricultural needs (Smith and Smith, 2003). Some of the remaining wetlands (Negortsi Spa, Bansko) are of great importance for understanding the genesis of marsh vegetation in the Republic of Macedonia as many mountainous marshes and peat bogs suffered anthropogenic transformation due to the capturing of water from mountain springs and streams for the purposes of generating drinking water (Smith, 2003). Accordingly, the fragmentation and transformation of previous swamps had a major impact on faunal distribution and abundance. Amphibians are the most affected species along with invertebrate and vertebrate groups including the European Otter (Lutra Lutra L.). It is listed as Nearly Threatened according to the IUCN’s red list and mainly found now only in the Belchishte wetland (Smith 2003; Smith and Smith, 2003).  The otter has importance for the wetland communities not just in Macedonia but also in other European countries such as the Netherlands and Germany (Reuther, 1995; Reuther et al., 2001). Macedonian wetlands lie within the network of some of the bigger rivers in Macedonia including the Vardar River, a catchment area equal to 80% of Macedonian territory.

South Africa
The South African Department of Environmental Affairs in conjunction with the departments of Water Affairs and Forestry, and of Agriculture, supports the conservation and rehabilitation of wetlands through the Working for Wetlands program. The aim of this program is to encourage the protection, rehabilitation and sustainable use of South African wetlands through co-operative governance and partnerships. The program is also a poverty relief effort, providing employment in wetland maintenance.

Sweden
The Swedish national wetland inventory (VMI) is one of the world's most extensive systematic inventories of nature types that has ever been done. VMI has surveyed the wetlands of Sweden below the alpine region during a 25-year period. In total 35 000 objects (sites) are included in VMI, corresponding to an area of 4.3 million hectares, or 10% of the land area of Sweden. The aim of the survey has been to increase the general knowledge of wetlands in Sweden, as a basis for environmental monitoring and natural resources planning. By investigating the impact of human activities on wetlands and identifying the most valuable wetlands, their values can be preserved for future generations. The results from the inventory were also meant to function as background data for the authorities' decisions concerning e.g. drainage permits.

United States

The US wetland conservation efforts are rooted partly in legislative requirements specifying that when a proposal is made to drain or fill a wetland, the proposers in many cases must offset the loss by restoring or constructing wetlands nearby that are of the same or greater size and levels of function. Several states within the US have additional requirements that must be met when wetland alteration is proposed. In addition, several federal programs provide financial incentives for wetland protection to private individuals whose land contains wetlands not completely protected by federal or state laws.

A restoration project by the State of Florida in the Everglades acquired U.S. Sugar Corporation land allowing for water delivery, water treatment, and water storage of sufficient quantity and quality to mimic the Everglades' natural system.

Kenya 

Ondiri is Kenya's largest wetland with 34.5 hectares and 40 springs.  By 2016, the Nyongara River, which flowed out of the wetland in Kikuyu, Kenya nearly dried up. Raw sewerage from Kikuyu flowed into at the highland bog. Water usage for the 44 neighboring green-house farms was unregulated. And solid waste was dumped in Ondiri.  

The Kiambu County Governor, Dr. James Nyoro said that the National government has set aside resources to improve the status of the wetland to be a tourist attraction. The National Environment Management Association Chairman John Konchellah stated that his organization has started monitoring and assessing the wetlands. The endeavor includes the creation of site-specific management plans for wetlands around the country. This research will inform future conservation and management plans for the wetlands.

Awarded wetland conservation projects

2015 
Weishan Wetland Park | ASLA National Awards | Professional Category | Award of Honor - General Design |

2014 
Liupanshui Minghu Wetland Park | ASLA National Awards | Professional Category | Award of Honor - General Design |

Hunter's Point South Waterfront Park | ASLA National Awards | Professional Category | Award of Honor - General Design |

2012 
Qunli Stormwater Park in Harbin | ASLA National Awards | Professional Category | Award of Excellent - General Design |

2011 
Stone River in Eastern New York State | ASLA National Awards | Professional Category | Award of Honor - General Design |

2010 
Shanghai Houtan Park | ASLA National Awards | Professional Category | Award of Excellent - General Design |

The Qinhuangdao Beach Restoration | ASLA National Awards | Professional Category | Award of Honor - General Design |

Tianjin Qiaoyuan Park | ASLA National Awards | Professional Category | Award of Honor - General Design |

2009 
Beijing Olympic Forest Park | ASLA National Awards | Professional Category | Award of Honor - General Design |

2008 
Lagoon Park in California | ASLA National Awards | Professional Category | Award of Honor - General Design |

See also

World Wetlands Day

References

External links
Short public tv program on Florida Everglades